Porphyrosela desmodiella is a moth of the family Gracillariidae. It is known from Brazil, Cuba, the Virgin Islands (Saint Thomas), Canada (Ontario) and the United States (including Kentucky, Maryland, Missouri, South Carolina, North Carolina, Pennsylvania, Tennessee, Texas, Indiana, Florida, Connecticut, Georgia, Maine, New York, Vermont and Washington).

The wingspan is 4.5–5 mm.

The larvae feed on Bradburya species, Centrosema virginianum, Desmodium species (including Desmodium tortuosum and Desmodium viridiflorum), Lespedeza species (including Lespedeza bicolor, Lespedeza capitata and Lespedeza thunbergii), Phaseolus species, Strophostyles leiosperma and Trifolium repens. They mine the leaves of their host plant. The mine has the form of a blotch mine on the underside of the leaf. They are gregarious. Pupation occurs within the mine.

References

External links
mothphotographersgroup
Bug Guide
Porphyrosela at microleps.org

Lithocolletinae
Moths described in 1859

Moths of North America
Lepidoptera of Canada
Lepidoptera of the United States
Taxa named by James Brackenridge Clemens
Leaf miners